Lamberto Cristiano Gori  (1730–1801) was an Italian painter and artist active mostly in Tuscany. He worked in an early Neoclassic style.

Life and work 
Lamberto Gori was born in Livorno. He became the pupil of Ignazio Hugford, the painter and monk of the Benedictine Abbey of Vallombrosa. Gori is known for painting, mostly reproductions of earlier masters, and designs produced in scagliola.

Notes

References
 Treccani encyclopedia entry

1730 births
1801 deaths
People from Livorno
18th-century Italian painters
Italian male painters
19th-century Italian painters
19th-century Italian male artists
Painters from Tuscany
Italian neoclassical painters
18th-century Italian male artists